The 2004 Ford 400 was an NASCAR Nextel Cup Series race held on November 21, 2004 at Homestead Miami Speedway in Homestead, Florida. Contested over 267 laps on the 1.5 mile (2.4 km) speedway, it was the 36th and final race of the 2004 NASCAR Nextel Cup Series season. Greg Biffle won the race and Kurt Busch  won the championship, both driving for Roush Racing. This was the last race without Kyle Busch until the 2011 AAA Texas 500.

Background
Homestead-Miami Speedway is a motor racing track located in Homestead, Florida. The track, which has several configurations, has promoted several series of racing, including NASCAR, the IndyCar Series, the Grand-Am Rolex Sports Car Series and the Championship Cup Series.

Since 2002, Homestead-Miami Speedway has hosted the final race of the season in all three of NASCAR's series: the Sprint Cup Series, Xfinity Series and the Camping World Truck Series. Ford Motor Company sponsors all three of the season-ending races; the races have the names Ford 400, Ford 300 and Ford 200, respectively, and the weekend is marketed as Ford Championship Weekend.

Entry list

Qualifying 
Qualifying took place on November 19, 2004. During Casey Mears' warmup lap, Mears would lose the back end of his car in the middle of Turns 3-4, slamming the back end into the wall and destroying the car. Mears would not be able to complete a lap in qualifying, so the #41 team took a provisional because the team was in the Top 35 in owner's points. However, they would have to start in the back because they had to bring in a backup car. The #93 of Geoff Bodine would also not run qualifying laps, this time due to unspecified reasons and would withdraw from the event.

*Qualified by being Top 35 in owner's points.

**Champion's Provisional.

***Did not start qualifying due to problems.

Race recap
This race was known as the deciding race of the 2004 Nextel Cup champion in the first ever Chase for the Nextel Cup, in which five drivers were still mathematically alive for the championship including the points leader, Kurt Busch with an 18-point margin ahead of Jimmie Johnson, who earned the most wins in 2004, Jeff Gordon, Dale Earnhardt Jr. and veteran Mark Martin. Those five chasers are separated by an 82-point margin from first to fifth for the final race. At the start of lap 1, Hermie Sadler got turned sideways while Mike Bliss was spun around but Johnson survived the wreck in the following caution. On lap 93, championship leader Kurt Busch was about to come to pit road. Busch told his crew on the radio that he had a flat right front tire. As Busch came out of the access road off of turn 4 that leads to the pits, Kurt lost the right front wheel. As the wheel came off, he almost hit the yellow barrels on the entrance of pit road which could have ended in a much different result. The caution came out as the wheel rolled down the entire front stretch. As a result of the tire loss, he lost the championship lead to Jeff Gordon, though Busch took back the points lead. With 3 laps to go, race leader Ryan Newman made some contact and lost the right side of the tire, the caution was out and set a Green-white-checker finish at Homestead.  At the restart, Greg Biffle held off the hard charging Hendrick teams of Jimmie Johnson and Jeff Gordon for the race lead and took the checkered flag to win the Ford 400, while Johnson and Gordon finished 2nd and 3rd. Kurt Busch won the 2004 NASCAR NEXTEL Cup Championship by just 8 points over Johnson with a 5th-place finish after starting on the Pole and leading the opening 4 laps, the closest margin in Cup history until the 2011 season, won by Tony Stewart. Stewart and Carl Edwards were tied following the 2011 season's last race, the Cup going to Stewart by virtue of more wins on the season, 5 to 1 respectively.

Race results

Race statistics
 Time of race: 3:50:55
 Average Speed: 
 Pole Speed: 
 Cautions: 14 for 79 laps
 Margin of Victory: 0.342
 Lead changes: 14
 Percent of race run under caution: 29.2%         
 Average green flag run: 12.8 laps

References

Ford 400
Ford 400
NASCAR races at Homestead-Miami Speedway